Mantica is a surname. Notable people with the surname include:

Alfredo Mantica (born 1943), Italian politician
Francesco Mantica (1534–1614), Roman Catholic cardinal
Germanicus Mantica (died 1639), Italian Roman Catholic bishop

Italian-language surnames